Leonid Vasylyovych Haidarzhy (born 20 May 1959) is a Soviet and Ukrainian retired footballer and Ukrainian manager.

External links
 
 Profile at the Odessa football website 

1959 births
Living people
Ukrainian people of Bulgarian descent
Bessarabian Bulgarians
Soviet footballers
Ukrainian footballers
Association football defenders
Soviet Top League players
SKA Odesa players
FC Krystal Kherson players
FC Nyva Vinnytsia players
FC Chornomorets Odesa players
SC Tavriya Simferopol players
FC Metalurh Zaporizhzhia players
FC Desna Chernihiv players
Ukrainian Premier League managers
Ukrainian football managers
FC Krystal Kherson managers
FC Chornomorets Odesa managers
MFC Mykolaiv managers
FC Nyva Vinnytsia managers
FC Zhemchuzhyna Odesa managers
Sportspeople from Odesa Oblast